Rives is a town in Obion County, Tennessee. The population was 326 at the 2010 census. It is part of the Union City, TN–KY Micropolitan Statistical Area.

Geography
Rives is located at  (36.357124, -89.049744).

Tennessee State Route 216 passes straight through the center of Rives.

Demographics

As of the census of 2000, there were 331 people, 127 households, and 94 families residing in the town. The racial makeup of the town was 93.96% White, 5.74% African American, and 0.30% from two or more races. Hispanic or Latino of any race were 0.91% of the population.

There were 127 households, out of which 34.6% had children under the age of 18 living with them, 56.7% were married couples living together, 12.6% had a female householder with no husband present, and 25.2% were non-families. 22.8% of all households were made up of individuals, and 10.2% had someone living alone who was 65 years of age or older. The average household size was 2.61 and the average family size was 3.03.

In the town, the population was spread out, with 26.9% under the age of 18, 8.5% from 18 to 24, 29.6% from 25 to 44, 20.2% from 45 to 64, and 14.8% who were 65 years of age or older. The median age was 36 years. For every 100 females, there were 91.3 males. For every 100 females age 18 and over, there were 92.1 males.

The median income for a household in the town was $26,964, and the median income for a family was $30,313. Males had a median income of $31,500 versus $12,917 for females. The per capita income for the town was $11,072. About 20.6% of families and 20.9% of the population were below the poverty line, including 22.1% of those under age 18 and 27.3% of those age 65 or over.

References

Towns in Obion County, Tennessee
Towns in Tennessee
Union City, Tennessee micropolitan area